The Haval Xiaolong Max (枭龙 Max) is a mid-size crossover SUV produced by Great Wall Motor under the Haval (marque) brand.

Overview

Originally codenamed B07 during development, the Xiaolong Max was launched in March 2023.

Powertrain
The Haval Xiaolong Max has two plug-in hybrid powertrains using either a 85kW naturally aspirated or a 113kW turbocharged 1.5-litre four-cylinder engine, with a choice of 9.41kWh and 19.27kWh battery packs with claimed WLTC pure electric range of 44km and 86km, respectively. The fuel consumption of the Haval Xiaolong Max is 5.6L/100km.

References

External links

Official website

H6
Xiaolong Max
Mid-size sport utility vehicles
Crossover sport utility vehicles
Front-wheel-drive vehicles
All-wheel-drive vehicles
Plug-in hybrid vehicles
Hybrid vehicles
Cars introduced in 2023
Cars of China